This is a list of airlines currently operating in Madagascar.

See also
 List of airlines
 List of defunct airlines of Madagascar

Madagascar
Airlines
Airlines
Madagascar